Beach soccer has been an event at the Bolivarian Beach Games since the first edition of the games in 2012 in Lima, Peru. One event is held, the men's competition.

The event is contested between the members of ODEBO (Bolivia, Chile, Colombia, Ecuador, Panama, Peru and Venezuela) who choose to enter, plus other invited neighboring nations who are not ODEBO members.

Paraguay are the most successful team, having claimed two gold medals and are the only nation to have claimed any medal at all three games to date.

Results

Summary

Medal table

Participating nations
Legend
GS — Group stage (there were no placement matches in 2012)
 — Host nation

References

External links
INTERNATIONAL BEACH SOCCER RESULTS - 2012 (MEN), Bolivarian Beach Games 2012 results, at theroonba.com
II Juegos Bolivarianos de Playa 2014 beach soccer results, at Beach Soccer Worldwide (archived)
III Juegos Bolivarianos de Playa 2016 beach soccer results, at Beach Soccer Worldwide (archived)

Bolivarian Beach Games
Sports at the Bolivarian Games
Bolivarian Beach Games